Full Employment Act may refer to:
 Employment Act of 1946, a United States federal law
 Humphrey–Hawkins Full Employment Act of 1978